Carnarvon Ironpolis Football Club was a football team from Caernarfon, Gwynedd. The club was formed in 1891 by Mr Arthur Menzies as the factory team of De Wintens Iron Works. The team were Welsh Cup semi-finalists twice.

Colours

Seasons

Cup History

Honours

References

Football clubs in Wales
Sport in Gwynedd
Caernarfon
Defunct football clubs in Wales
Works association football teams in Wales
Association football clubs established in 1891
Association football clubs disestablished in 1903
North Wales Coast League clubs